Notoedres is a genus of mites belonging to the family Sarcoptidae.

The genus has cosmopolitan distribution.

Species:

Notoedres alepis 
Notoedres cati 
Notoedres centrifera 
Notoedres chiropteralis 
Notoedres cuniculi 
Notoedres miniopteri 
Notoedres muris 
Notoedres musculii

References

Acari